Gazoryctra wielgusi is a moth of the family Hepialidae. It is known from Arizona and New Mexico.

The length of the forewings is 15–18 mm. Adults are pink and silvery. They are on wing in July and August.

References

Moths described in 1988
Hepialidae
Moths of North America